Fain-lès-Moutiers (literally Fain near Moutiers) is a commune in the Côte-d'Or department in Bourgogne-Franche-Comté in eastern France.

Geography

Population

Personalities
It was the birthplace of Catherine Labouré (1806–1876), Catholic saint.

See also
Communes of the Côte-d'Or department

References

Communes of Côte-d'Or
Côte-d'Or communes articles needing translation from French Wikipedia